Hollister can refer to:

Places

United States
 Hollister, California
 Hollister, Florida
 Hollister, Idaho
 Hollister, Missouri
 Hollister, North Carolina
 Hollister, Oklahoma
 Hollisterville, Pennsylvania
 Hollister, Wisconsin
 Hollister Ranch, a ranch north of Santa Barbara, California

Other uses
 Hollister (surname), an English family name
 USS Hollister (DD-788), a United States Navy Gearing Class destroyer
 Hollister Co., HCO, or simply Hollister, an American clothing brand from Abercrombie & Fitch Co.
 Naval Auxiliary Air Station Hollister
 Hollister riot, one of the first instances of motorcycle gang activity, in 1947
 Hollister Municipal Airport, a public general aviation airport located in Hollister, California